

CFU Qualifying Tournament

Preliminary round

First round

Group A

Group B

Group C

Group D

Final round

Group A

Group B

UNCAF Qualification Tournament

The UNCAF Nations Cup acted as the Gold Cup qualifying tournament for the Central American teams. The teams qualifying were Costa Rica, Guatemala and El Salvador

Qualifying round

See also

External links
 Results and line-ups at rsssf.com

CONCACAF Gold Cup qualification
Qual
Qualification

ca:Classificació per al Campionat de la CONCACAF 1969